Aleksander Myszczyński was a Roman Catholic prelate who served as Auxiliary Bishop of Włocławek (1514–?).

Biography
On 20 Feb 1514, Valerius Wilezogerzosi was appointed during the papacy of Pope Leo X as Auxiliary Bishop of Włocławek and Titular Bishop of Margarita. It is uncertain how long he served. While bishop, he was the principal co-consecrator of Rafał Leszczyński (bishop), Bishop of Przemyśl (1524);  Jan Karnkowski (bishop), Bishop of Przemyśl (1528); Dominik Malachowski, Auxiliary Bishop of Kraków and Titular Bishop of Laodicea in Phrygia (1528); and Mikolaj Brolinski, Auxiliary Bishop of Płock and Titular Bishop of Lacedaemonia (1533).

References 

16th-century Roman Catholic bishops in Poland
Bishops appointed by Pope Leo X